Martin Karafiat (born 21 October 1985) is a Slovak former professional ice hockey player who played with HC Slovan Bratislava in the Slovak Extraliga.

References

Living people
HC Slovan Bratislava players
1985 births
Slovak ice hockey defencemen
Ice hockey people from Bratislava
Boxers de Bordeaux players
HDK Maribor players
Naprzód Janów players
Toronto St. Michael's Majors players
Slovak expatriate ice hockey players in Canada
Slovak expatriate sportspeople in France
Slovak expatriate sportspeople in Slovenia
Slovak expatriate sportspeople in Poland
Expatriate ice hockey players in France
Expatriate ice hockey players in Poland
Expatriate ice hockey players in Slovenia